St. Theresa's Cathedral, also called Caxias do Sul Cathedral, is a parish of the Roman Catholic Church in Caxias do Sul, Rio Grande do Sul, Brazil, and the cathedral of the Diocese of Caxias do Sul.

The cathedral church is located in Dante Alighieri Square in the city center. It dedicated to St. Theresa of Ávila, reflecting the appreciation of the local Italian immigrants to the Empress Teresa Cristina, wife of Pedro II, emperor of Brazil.

The first stone of the church was laid on 5 December 1895. The work proceeded rapidly, with the spontaneous support of the settlers. It was enclosed by mid-1896, solemnly inaugurated on 14 October 1899, and consecrated by bishop Cláudio Gonçalves Ponce de Leon on 15 October 1900, the Feast of St. Theresa. It was designated a cathedral in 1934, with the erection of the Diocese of Caxias.

See also
Catholic Church in Brazil
Pietro Nosadini
Historic Center of Caxias do Sul

References

Theresa
Buildings and structures in Caxias do Sul
Roman Catholic churches completed in 1899
Roman Catholic Ecclesiastical Province of Porto Alegre
Gothic Revival church buildings in Brazil
19th-century Roman Catholic church buildings in Brazil